Roberta Willis (born March 6, 1951) is an American politician who served in the Connecticut House of Representatives from the 64th district from 2001 to 2017.

References

1951 births
Living people
Democratic Party members of the Connecticut House of Representatives